Mocis repanda, the striped grass looper, is a species of moth of the family Erebidae. It was described by Johan Christian Fabricius in 1794. It is found in Central America and the Caribbean, including Cuba, the Dominican Republic, Guadeloupe, Guatemala, Jamaica, Puerto Rico and Saint Thomas. Strays can be found in the United States, up to southern Texas as well as subtropical Africa south of the Sahara, including the islands of the Indian Ocean.

The larvae feed on various grasses, including Cenchrus viridis, Trichlons pluriflora, Eriochloa punctata, Leptochloa walleye and Panica fasciculata. It is considered a pest on corn, sugarcane and Bermuda grass.

References

External links
"Remigia repanda" with images of male genitalia. Moths of the Grenadines.

Moths of Africa
Moths of Réunion
Moths of the Middle East
Moths described in 1794
repanda